

Early History: The Ottoman Empire
In ancient times Plutarch wrote of oil bubbling from the ground near Kirkuk, but oil exploration did not begin until the 20th century when the Ottoman Empire granted a concession allowing William Knox D'Arcy to explore oil fields in the territories which, after the dissolution of the Ottoman Empire, became the modern countries of Iran and Iraq. Though the company, called African and Eastern Concession Ltd, was unable to find oil at first, D'Arcy and other European partners founded the Turkish Petroleum Company (TPC) in 1912.

TPC was formed with the purpose of acquiring concessions from the Ottoman Empire to explore for oil in Mesopotamia. The owners were a group of large European companies: Deutsche Bank; the Anglo Saxon Oil Company, a subsidiary of Royal Dutch Shell; the National Bank of Turkey, a British concern; and Turkish-born Armenian businessman Calouste Gulbenkian. The driving force behind TPC's creation was Gulbenkian, while the largest single shareholder was the British Government-controlled Anglo-Persian Oil Company, which held 50% of the shares by 1914. TPC received a promise of a concession from the Ottoman government but the outbreak of World War I in 1914 put a stop to all exploration plans.

Aftermath of World War I
After the partition of the Ottoman Empire, the British gained control of Mosul in 1921, and the British-backed Faisal I of Iraq became the first King of Iraq.

In 1925, TPC obtained a 75-year concession to explore for oil in exchange for a promise that the Iraqi government would receive a royalty for every ton of oil extracted. A well at Baba Gurgur was located by geologist J.M. Muir just north of Kirkuk. Drilling started, and in the early hours of 14 October 1927 oil was struck. Many tons of oil were spilled before the gushing well was brought under control, and the oil field soon proved to be extensive.

Discovery of oil in Kirkuk hastened the negotiations over the composition of TPC, and on 31 July 1928 shareholders signed a formal partnership agreement to include the Near East Development Corporation (NEDC) — an American consortium of five large US oil companies that included Standard Oil of New Jersey, Standard Oil Company of New York (Socony), Gulf Oil, the Pan-American Petroleum and Transport Company, and Atlantic Richfield Co. (By 1935 only Standard Oil of New Jersey and Standard Oil of New York were left).

The agreement was called the Red Line Agreement for the "red line" drawn around the former boundaries of the Ottoman Empire (with the exception of Kuwait), and it effectively bound the partners to act together within the red line. Writer and former IPC employee Stephen Hemsley Longrigg noted that "[T]he Red Line Agreement, variously assessed as a sad case of wrongful cartelization or as an enlightened example of international co‑operation and fair-sharing, was to hold the field for twenty years and in large measure determined the pattern and tempo of oil development over a large part of the Middle East".

TPC shares were held in the following proportions: 23.75% each to the Anglo-Persian Oil Company, Royal Dutch/Shell, the Compagnie Française des Pétroles (CFP), and the NEDC; the remaining 5% went to Calouste Gulbenkian. In 1929, the TPC was renamed the Iraq Petroleum Company.

Between 1925 and 1931 the government of Iraq received a lump sum payment of £400,000, but after 1931 the government was paid a royalty of 4 gold shillings per ton of crude oil produced. (This royalty was increased to six shillings in August 1950.) In 1931, the Iraqi government and IPC reached an agreement for a new 70 year concession, in exchange for increased payments to Iraq and an agreement that two pipelines to the Mediterranean would be built by 1935. By this time the Mosul Oil Company was already operated by IPC, and when the company was granted a third concession in 1938 the Basrah Petroleum Company was created to develop assets in Iraq's southern regions.

The Red Line Agreement lasted until 1948 when two of the American partners broke free. During the period, IPC monopolized oil exploration inside the Red Line; excluding Saudi Arabia and Bahrain, where ARAMCO (formed in 1944 by renaming of the Saudi subsidiary of Standard Oil of California (Socal)) and Bahrain Petroleum Company (BAPCO) respectively held controlling position.

Iraqi Petroleum Company
Following the creation of the State of Israel the Iraq-Haifa pipeline was shut down, and in its place a new line was built from Kirkuk to the Syrian Mediterranean port of Baniyas. The pipelines were closed between November 1956 and March 1957 when Syrian pumping stations were destroyed during the Suez crisis, which caused a financial crisis in Iraq. Iraq could not transport its oil through the Persian Gulf while the Suez Canal remained closed, so the closure of the Mediterranean pipelines meant Iraqi oil production ground to a standstill.

After Muhammad Mossadegh nationalized the oil industry in Iran, IPC agreed to accept an "equal profit sharing" arrangement in 1952. Instead of a flat royalty payment, Iraq would be paid 12.5% of the sale price of each barrel. However, foreign company control of Iraq's oil assets was unpopular and in 1958 Abd al-Karim Qasim overthrew Faisal II of Iraq. After seizing control of the Iraqi government, Qasim demanded better terms from IPC but decided against nationalization of Iraq's petroleum assets.

In 1961 Iraq passed Public Law 80 whereby Iraq expropriated 95% of IPC's concessions and the Iraq National Oil Company was created and empowered to develop the assets seized from IPC under Law 80. This arrangement continued in 1970 when the government demanded even more control over IPC, eventually nationalizing IPC after negotiations between the company and the government broke down. By this time the Ba'ath Party was in power in Iraq and Saddam Hussein was its de facto ruler, although Ahmed Hassan al-Bakr did not formally step down as President until 1979.

Iraq War and Post-War developments
In February 2007, the Iraqi cabinet approved a draft law that would distribute oil revenues to the various regions and provinces of Iraq based on population, and would also give regional oil companies the authority to enter into contractual arrangements directly with foreign companies concerning the exploration and development of oil fields. Iraqis remained divided over provisions allowing regional governments to enter into contracts directly with foreign companies; while strongly supported by Kurds, Sunni Arabs wanted the Oil Ministry to retain signing power. As a compromise the draft law proposed that a new body called the Federal Oil and Gas Council would be created that could, in some circumstances, prevent execution of contracts signed by regional governments. This arrangement would undo the nationalization of the Iraqi oil industry that dates back to 1972.

Under Article I of the 2010 Law of Income Taxation on Foreign Oil Companies Working in Iraq, there is a 35% tax on "income earned in Iraq from the contracts signed with the Foreign Oil Companies, their subsidiaries, branches, or offices and their subcontractors working in Iraq in the field of oil and gas extraction and production and the relevant industries". The production contracts, which foreign oil companies enter into with the Iraqi federal or regional governments, often include revenue-sharing terms as well.

Additionally, in the last few years oil production in Iraq has increased rapidly and seems to be headed in even more of a direction where it will be even more heavily relied on.

References

Iraq
Ottoman Iraq
20th century in Iraqi Kurdistan
21st century in Iraqi Kurdistan
20th century in Iraq
21st century in Iraq
19th century in the Ottoman Empire